The 1929 Fordham Rams football team was an American football team that represented Fordham University as an independent during the 1929 college football season. In its third year under head coach Frank Cavanaugh, Fordham compiled a 7–0–2 record, shut out six of nine opponents, and outscored all opponents by a total of 176 to 19.

Schedule

References

Fordham
Fordham Rams football seasons
College football undefeated seasons
Fordham Rams football